Josephine Leslie (1898–1979) was an Irish writer, usually under the name R. A. Dick (taking the initials from her sea captain father, Robert Abercromby). She most famously wrote the 1945 novel The Ghost and Mrs. Muir, which was made into a 1947 film and adapted for a 1960s TV series.

She also wrote the novel The Devil and Mrs. Devine.

Selected works
 Dick, R. A. (1945). The Ghost and Mrs. Muir. London, White Lion Ltd.
 Dick, R. A. (1954). Unpainted Portrait. London, Hodder and Stoughton.
 Leslie, J. (1975). The Devil and Mrs Devine. London, Millington.

References

Sources
 Stetz, Margaret D (1996) "The Ghost and Mrs. Muir: Laughing with the captain in the house", Studies in the Novel, Vol. 28, Iss 1, (Spring 1996), pp. 93–112.

1898 births
1979 deaths
Irish fantasy writers
20th-century Irish women writers